Jin Tae-hyun (born Kim Tae-hyun on February 15, 1981) is a South Korean actor.

Personal life 
In December 2014, Jin announced his engagement to his Pure Pumpkin Flower co-star Park Si-eun. The couple got married in July 2015.

In 2019, Jin and his wife announced that they had adopted a teenage girl whom they had met at an orphanage four years prior. On February 21, 2022, he announced that his wife was pregnant after having had two miscarriages. Later, in August, he announced that his wife had miscarried 20 days before her due date.

Filmography

Television series

Films

Television shows

Ambassadorship 
 The 7th Sponsor of the Companion Club  (2022)

Awards and nominations

References

External links
  
  
 
 
 

South Korean male television actors
South Korean male film actors
1981 births
Living people
Seoul Institute of the Arts alumni
Signal Entertainment Group artists